Chemositia is an extinct genus of chalicothere, a group of herbivorous, odd-toed ungulate (perissodactyl) mammals. They lived in Africa, and had claws that were likely used in a hook-like manner to pull down branches, suggesting they lived as bipedal browsers.

Many authorities do not believe that Chemositia is a valid genus and synonymize it with Ancylotherium or Metaschizotherium.

References

Sources
 Classification of Mammals by Malcolm C. McKenna and Susan K. Bell

Chalicotheres
Miocene mammals of Africa
Miocene odd-toed ungulates
Fossil taxa described in 1979